The Conotton Valley Union Local School District is a public school district based in Bowerston, Ohio, United States. It serves northwestern Harrison County (including all of Monroe Township as well as portions of Franklin and North townships) and southwestern Carroll County (including all of Orange Township and portions of Monroe Township). Three incorporated villages are contained within the district: Bowerston, Leesville, and Sherrodsville.

Schools 
 Conotton Valley High School  (Grades 6-12)
 Conotton Valley Elementary (Formerly both Bowerston Elementary until 2016, Sherrodsville Elementary until 2014) (Grades PreK, K, 1-5)

See also 
 East Central Ohio ESC
 List of school districts in Ohio

References

External links 
 

School districts in Ohio
Education in Carroll County, Ohio
Education in Harrison County, Ohio